Corneille "Cornelis" Henri Albert Wellens (born 14 July 1905 in Etterbeek, date of death unknown) was a Belgian field hockey player who competed in the 1928 Summer Olympics and in the 1936 Summer Olympics.

He was a member of the Belgian field hockey team which finished fourth in the 1928 Olympic tournament. He played all five matches as back.

Eight years later he was part of the Belgian team which was eliminated in the first round of the 1936 Olympic tournament. He played all three matches.

External links
 
Corneille Wellens' profile at Sports Reference.com

1905 births
Year of death missing
Belgian male field hockey players
Olympic field hockey players of Belgium
Field hockey players at the 1928 Summer Olympics
Field hockey players at the 1936 Summer Olympics